Selepa discigera is a moth of the family Nolidae first described by Francis Walker in 1864. It is found in Oriental tropics of India, Sri Lanka, New Guinea and Australia.

Description
Its forewings are blackish. A black longitudinal streak with a whitish border can be found sub-dorsally.

The larval food plants are Stillingia, Ficus and Rhus species.

References

External links
Seasonal occurrence of insect-pests on aonla (Emblica officinalis Geartn) and their natural enemies

Moths of Asia
Moths described in 1864
Nolidae